Hans Wolff Glaser (also Hanns Glaser, Hans Glasser, Hans Wolff Glaßer) (c. 1500  June 1573) was a printer, block-cutter, woodcut tinter and publisher from Nuremberg in the Holy Roman Empire, known for printing broadsheets, some featuring woodcut illustrations. Glaser produced prints between 1540 and 1572. He died in June 1573.

Life
Hans Glaser also referred to himself as a wood cutter, letter painter and letter printer and is listed as such from 1538 in the office books of the city of Nuremberg. Until 1553 he lived in Nuremberg in what he referred to himself as the "Schmelzhütten", after which Glaser had his workshop in the immediate vicinity of the parish church of St. Lorenz. 

Glaser is most-known for printing a broadsheet news article on 14 April 1561 describing a mass sighting of a celestial event or unidentified flying objects that occurred over Nuremberg on 4 April the same year. The broadsheet, illustrated with a woodcut engraving and text, is preserved at the Zentralbibliothek Zürich in Zurich, Switzerland. It describes objects of various shapes including crosses, spears, discs, a crescent, and a tubular object from which several smaller, round objects emerged and darted around the sky at dawn. Among ufologists Glaser's picture report is interpreted as a UFO landing or even as a witness protocol of a spaceship battle over Nuremberg. Rather, however, the two cylindrical objects running diagonally downward resemble the phenomenon of the parhelion and the further lines similar halo effects. Numerous simpler depictions of such atmospheric reflections are known from the 16th and 17th centuries. 

Glaser was married, and after 1575 his widow married Wolf Drechsel, a former apprentice of her husband, who continued Glaser's workshop and continued to use his printing blocks.

References

External links

 Selected works of Hans Glaser

1500s births
1573 deaths
Businesspeople from Nuremberg
German printmakers
16th-century German people